William Charles Crook (7 June 1926 – 29 May 2011) was an English footballer who spent the majority of his playing career at Wolverhampton Wanderers, with whom he won the 1949 FA Cup.

Career
Crook first joined Wolverhampton Wanderers in August 1940 aged 14, eventually signed professional forms three years later. He made his debut in a League War Cup tie on 10 January 1942 against Blackpool, en route to lifting the trophy. He made 121 wartime appearances for the club in total, as well as guesting for Aldershot and Chelsea.

He became a regular first team player when league football recommenced in 1946, and held his place over the next six seasons. He was part of the team that lifted the FA Cup in 1949, beating Leicester City 3–1 at Wembley. However, Crook lost his place in the 1952–53 season to Ron Flowers and left for Walsall in October 1954.

He spent two seasons in the Third Division with the Saddlers then dropped into the non-league with Wellington Town before retiring in 1960 aged 34.

After giving up the game, he worked as a structural draughtsman for an engineering company in Darlaston, a role he had already held part-time during his playing days.

Honours
with Wolves
League War Cup winner 1942
FA Cup winner 1949.
Charity Shield (shared) 1949.

References
 

1926 births
2011 deaths
Footballers from Wolverhampton
English footballers
English Football League players
Wolverhampton Wanderers F.C. players
Walsall F.C. players
Telford United F.C. players
Association football wing halves
FA Cup Final players